The 2014 Northern European Gymnastics Championships was an artistic gymnastics competition held in Greve, Denmark. The event was held between the 12th and 14 September at the Greve Idrætscenter.

Medalists

References 

Northern European Gymnastics Championships
2014 in gymnastics